The 1995 Grand Prix de Tennis de Lyon was a men's tennis tournament played on indoor carpet courts at the Palais des Sports de Gerland in Lyon, France, and was part of the World Series of the 1995 ATP Tour. It was the ninth edition of the tournament and was held from 16 October through 23 October 1995. Fourth-seeded Wayne Ferreira won the singles title.

Finals

Singles

 Wayne Ferreira defeated  Pete Sampras 7–6(7–2), 5–7, 6–3
 It was Ferreira's 5th title of the year and the 16th of his career.

Doubles

 Jakob Hlasek /  Yevgeny Kafelnikov defeated  John-Laffnie de Jager /  Wayne Ferreira 6–3, 6–3
 It was Hlasek's only title of the year and the 25th of his career. It was Kafelnikov's 8th title of the year and the 15th of his career.

References

External links
 ITF tournament edition details

Grand Prix de Tennis de Lyon
1995
Grand Prix de Tennis de Lyon